Suzanne "Susi" Wirz (born 30 November 1931) is a Swiss figure skater. She is the 1952 Swiss national champion. Wirz represented Switzerland at the 1952 Winter Olympics where she placed 15th. She was the sister-in-law of British figure skater Jeannette Altwegg.

Competitive highlights

References

 Susi Wirz's profile at Sports Reference.com
 List of Historical Swiss Champions

Swiss female single skaters
Olympic figure skaters of Switzerland
Figure skaters at the 1952 Winter Olympics
1931 births
Living people